Malena Mieres García (born 29 March 2000) is a Spanish professional footballer who plays as a goalkeeper for Liga F club Real Betis.

Club career
Mieres started her career at Friol. In 2018, she was awarded the Best Galician Goalkeeper of the Year award.

International career
Mieres has represented the Spain under-19 football team. With them, she won the 2018 UEFA Championship.

References

External links
Profile at La Liga

2000 births
Living people
Women's association football goalkeepers
Spanish women's footballers
Footballers from As Pontes de García Rodríguez
Deportivo de La Coruña (women) players
SD Eibar Femenino players
Primera División (women) players
Segunda Federación (women) players
Spain women's youth international footballers